Hadrothemis is a genus of dragonfly in the family Libellulidae. They are commonly known as jungle-skimmers.

Species
The genus contains the following species:

References

Libellulidae
Anisoptera genera
Taxa named by Ferdinand Karsch
Taxonomy articles created by Polbot